Richmond Hill is an Australian television soap opera made in 1988 by the Reg Grundy Organisation for the Ten Network. It was devised by Reg Watson who also created Neighbours. It debuted on 27 January 1988 in a two-hour episode on Network 10 at 7.30pm. The series was only moderately successful and was cancelled on 22 June 1988. A total of 91 episodes were produced.

Synopsis
Whereas Neighbours was set in Melbourne, this series was set in a small fictional Australian country town near Sydney and most of the scenes revolved around the local police station, a real estate agency, and the pub. The serial drew comparisons to the hugely popular Seven Network soap operas, A Country Practice and Cop Shop. The programme was produced in Sydney, some location shooting took place in Mona Vale, New South Wales. Connie Ryan's house in the series was in Berryman Street, North Ryde NSW.

The cast was intentionally made up of experienced soap actors in a bid to secure immediate success. Well-known names included Maggie Kirkpatrick, Amanda Muggleton, Paula Duncan and Tim Elston from Prisoner. Popular veteran actress, Gwen Plumb, famous for her long-running role as Ada Simmonds in The Young Doctors, starred as Mum Foote. There were also several actors from Sons and Daughters, including Tom Richards, Rona Coleman, Angela Kennedy and Michael Long, as well as an assortment of young beginners, Ashley Paske, Emily Symons (pre Home and Away), Marc Gray, and Melissa Tkautz, all made their TV debuts in the series. Former comedy star Ross Higgins of Kingswood Country played the central role of the local police officer and family man Dan Costello.

Broadcast history
Richmond Hill was broadcast on Network Ten in an evening timeslot 19:30–20:30 as two one-hour episodes each week on Wednesdays and Thursdays.

The series, although quite popular, was considered a lukewarm success in the Australian ratings, and was cancelled after six months in June 1988, and ended abruptly at episode 92 later that year. The decision came as a shock to producers, not least due to the fact that key actors contracts had just been extended for another year. As a result, the actors continued to be paid even though the series was no longer in production. There was not a definitive conclusion to the series because production was expected to continue. A final blow was the series had just been sold to the ITV network in the UK the very week it was axed in Australia, but ITV still aired all the episodes.

During early 1990 Channel Ten replayed Richmond Hill at 3.00pm weekday afternoons though after only 35 episodes that were replayed it was then abruptly removed from its programming schedule in replacement of US chat shows like “Donahue” and “Oprah Winfrey”. The remaining episodes have still not been seen on Ten since their original 1988 broadcast.

Foxtel's UKTV Gold channel in Australia replayed the entire Richmond Hill series during the late 1990s between 1996 and 1997 during weekday mornings at 9.00am. Series has not been seen in the last 20 years on Australian TV and is waiting to be seen again whether it be released through DVD consumption or by a streaming channel.

International screenings 
The UK's ITV bought Richmond Hill  in June 1988, and it was announced by the network in August that encouraged by the huge success of its sister-series Neighbours on the BBC, they had paid £600'000 for the rights to screen the series. Thames Television, the ITV region serving the London area, managed the series for the network, and regions opted in to a dedicated feed from Thames.   ITV decided to show Richmond Hill in a daytime Wednesday and Thursday 14:00 slot and it began 5 October 1988. The intention was for all ITV regions to air the same episode, on the same day, at the same time, which would have been a first for an Australian soap opera on ITV, but had been tried once before with the American daytime soap opera Santa Barbara in 1987. Many of the ITV regions temporarily dropped another Australian series, A Country Practice, from their schedule to make way for the two weekly episodes of Richmond Hill and it isn't  known whether it was ever intended to be a networked primetime series on ITV, but Network Ten's cancellation of Richmond Hill seemingly resulted in ITV losing interest in the series, and its mid-afternoon timeslot meant that it didn't achieve anywhere near the audience figures that Neighbours, was achieving in its tea-time slot over on BBC One.

Due to local programming commitments, Granada Television started the series two weeks later than the rest of the ITV network, and started to screen the series weekly from 20 October 1988, and chose to screen A Country Practice in the Thursday slot instead. In 1990 the series was moved to a Sunday and didn't finish until spring 1991.

Central Television also broke away from the network screenings in 1989, eventually falling behind the rest of the network by dropping to one episode a week towards the end of its run (running Quincy in the Thursday slot instead). The majority of ITV regions resumed A Country Practice as its replacement, with regional UK viewers now considerably behind Australia and at varying parts of the storyline.

Richmond Hill was last screened in the UK in the mid-1990s on cable & satellite channel Wire TV (hosted by Femi Oke and co hosted Chris Stacey with guest presenters Darren Edwards, and Darren Gray), it was screened back to back with USA soap The Bold and the Beautiful, before Wire TV was finally axed in 1994.

The show was also screened on TVNZ in New Zealand from 1989 to 1990. All episodes were played.

Grundy also sold the soap to German television channel Pro 7, and Richmond Hill was dubbed into German. It was aired twice a week from 1991 to 1992.

Major cast

Warren Bryant – Tim Elston
Janet Bryant – Paula Duncan
Marty Bryant – Ashley Paske
Dan Costello – Ross Higgins
Anne Costello – Emily Symons
Mum Foote – Gwen Plumb
Ivy Hackett – Maggie Kirkpatrick
Connie Ryan – Amanda Muggleton
Andrew Ryan – Marc Gray
Tim Shannon – Robert Sampson
Susan Miller – Felicity Soper
Jill Warner – Dina Panozzo
Gary Turner – Dane Carson
Mark Johnson – Warren Blondell
Nikki Spencer – Danielle Carter
Vince Comino – Manny Katts
Mavis Roberts – Betty Lucas
Frank Hackett – Robert Alexander
Roger Lawson – Peter Kowitz
Alice Costello – Rona Coleman
Craig Connors – Michael Long
Lawrie Benson – Tom Richards
Evelyn Thomas – Jan Kingsbury
Beatrice White – Moya O'Sullivan
Mrs Jennings – Thelma Scott
Jeff Wilson – Tim McCunn
Fiona Matthews – Angela Kennedy
Ben Brown – Dennis Grosvenor

Home media 
As of March 2021, there has been no DVD Release of Richmond Hill.

References

External links
Aussie Soap Archive: Richmond Hill
Richmond Hill at the National Film and Sound Archive

Australian television soap operas
Network 10 original programming
Television series produced by The Reg Grundy Organisation
Television shows set in New South Wales
1988 Australian television series debuts
1989 Australian television series endings
English-language television shows